Alan James Hirschfield (October 10, 1935 – January 15, 2015) was an American film studio executive and philanthropist. Hirschfield served as the CEO of Columbia Pictures from 1973 to 1978 and the chairman of 20th Century Fox from 1982 until 1986. Outside of the film industry, Hirschfield helped Clive Davis establish Arista Records in the 1970s.

Early life and education
Hirschfield was born to a Jewish family in New York City on October 10, 1935, to Norman and Betty Hirschfield. The family moved to Oklahoma City when he was three-years old, where his father worked for Allen & Company's natural gas operations. Hirschfield received a bachelor's degree from the University of Oklahoma and a master's degree from Harvard Business School.

Career 
After school, Hirschfield went to work for Allen & Company (he was a close friend with its founder Charles Allen Jr.) and after Allen & Company took a financial stake in the film studio Warner Bros., Hirschfield was appointed financial vice president.

In 1973, again after Allen & Co took a financial stake in Columbia Pictures, Hirschfield was appointed CEO serving in that position from 1973 to 1978. In 1978, Hirschfield was forced out of Columbia Pictures after being pressured by members of the board of directors, chiefly  Herb Allen, into the disastrous reinstating of David Begelman, a studio executive who had embezzled $61,000 from Columbia, despite being vehemently against it. In 1981, Hirschfield was hired by Marvin Davis to be the chairman of 20th Century Fox; he resigned in 1984 and was replaced by Barry Diller. From 1990 to 1992, Alan Hirschfield served as a co-CEO and investment banker for the former Financial News Network. He was also the co-CEO of the Data Broadcasting Corp from 1992 to 2000.

The Begelman embezzlement and its aftermath were the subject of the best-selling 1982 non-fiction book Indecent Exposure by David McClintick.

In 1992, he opposed his friend, attorney Gerry Spence's decision to defend Randy Weaver on charges following the Ruby Ridge siege.

Personal life and death
In 1962, Hirschfield married Berte Schindelheim; they had three children: Scott Hirschfield; Marc Hirschfield; and Laura Hirschfield. Hirschfield died from natural causes at his home in Wilson, Wyoming, on January 15, 2015, at the age of 79.

References

2015 deaths
American film studio executives
American television executives
American philanthropists
Jewish American philanthropists
Columbia Pictures people
Presidents of Columbia Pictures
20th Century Studios people
Harvard Business School alumni
University of Oklahoma alumni
People from Wilson, Wyoming
Businesspeople from Oklahoma City
1935 births